Monilea gloriola, common name the fawn top shell, is a species of small sea snail, a marine gastropod mollusk in the family Trochidae, the top snails.

Description
The size of the shell varies between 6 mm and 10 mm.

Distribution
This marine species occurs off Southeast Australia.

References

External links
 

gloriola
Gastropods described in 1929